Mimotropidema is a genus of longhorn beetles of the subfamily Lamiinae, containing the following species:

 Mimotropidema chrysocephala Breuning, 1957
 Mimotropidema nigerrima Breuning, 1964

References

Pteropliini